Even If may refer to:
 "Even If" (Andy Abraham song), by Andy Abraham from the album Even If
 "Even If" (Ken Hirai song), by Ken Hirai from the album Gaining Through Losing
 "Even If", by Kutless from the album Believer
 "Even If", single by Christian rock band MercyMe
 "Even If" (ZOEgirl song), by ZOEgirl from Life